The Light Ages is a steampunk and alternate history fantasy novel by Ian R. MacLeod. The novel is set in an alternate Victorian England during an Industrial Revolution fueled by a dangerous magical substance known as aether.

Plot
The Light Ages takes place in an industrializing England that relies on the mining of aether, a magical fifth element. Society is structured by a rigid labor caste system of guilds. The narrator and protagonist of the novel, Robert Borrows, belongs to a lowly guild in a Yorkshire mining village. He eventually journeys to London, where he joins a group of thieves, pickpockets, and revolutionaries who seek to overthrow the caste system.

Publication history
 2003, UK, Earthlight (a former imprint of Simon & Schuster) , Pub date May 2003, Hardback
 2003, US, Ace Books , Pub date May 2003, Hardback
 2004, UK, Simon & Schuster , Pub date 5 April 2004, Paperback
 2004, US, Ace Trade, Pub date 6 April 2004, Paperback

Literary significance and reception

The novel was received favorably. Jon Courtenay Grimwood, writing in The Guardian, described it as "[a] quiet, understated monster of a novel". 
Publishers Weekly noted the novel's strong character development and "gritty, alternate London" and recommended it to readers "who love the more sophisticated fantasy of Michael Swanwick, John Crowley or even China Miéville."

The novel won nominated for a World Fantasy Award in 2004. Because of its favorable reviews and broader publishing promotion, it has been described by critics as MacLeod's "breakthrough" work.

References

External links

2003 British novels
2003 fantasy novels
British alternative history novels